Arrhopalites is a genus of springtails in the family Sminthuridae.

Species
 Arrhopalites acanthophthalmus 
 Arrhopalites buekkensis 
 Arrhopalites caecus Tullberg, 1871
 Arrhopalites cochlearifer Gisin, 1947
 Arrhopalites dudichii 
 Arrhopalites hungaricus 
 Arrhopalites ornatus 
 Arrhopalites principalis Stach, 1945
 Arrhopalites pseudoappendices Rusek, 1967
 Arrhopalites pygmaeus (Wankel, 1860)
 Arrhopalites secundarius Gisin, 1958
 Arrhopalites sericus Gisin, 1947
 Arrhopalites spinosus Rusek, 1967
 Arrhopalites terricola 
 Arrhopalites tenuis 
 Arrhopalites ulehlovae

References

Collembola